Joseph Jean Louis Normand Baron (born December 15, 1957) is a Canadian retired ice hockey player who played 27 games in the National Hockey League with the Montreal Canadiens and St. Louis Blues between 1984 and 1986. He was also, for a time, a professional bodybuilder.

Born in Verdun, Quebec, Baron had played junior hockey with the Montreal Jr. Canadiens in 1976–77 and then quit to pursue a career in bodybuilding. In 1983, he made a comeback, and the Canadiens signed him to a contract. He was later acquired by the St. Louis Blues, in exchange for cash, but only played  in 23 games before being sent to the minors. Baron retired at season's end.

Career statistics

Regular season and playoffs

References

External links
 

1957 births
Living people
Canadian bodybuilders
Canadian ice hockey left wingers
Flint Spirits players
Ice hockey people from Montreal
Montreal Canadiens players
Nova Scotia Voyageurs players
People from Verdun, Quebec
Peoria Rivermen (IHL) players
St. Louis Blues players
Sherbrooke Canadiens players
Undrafted National Hockey League players